Robert “Bob” Joseph Annis (September 5, 1928 – March 31, 1995) was an American soccer defender. He was a member of both the 1948 United States Olympic soccer team and the U.S. team at the 1950 FIFA World Cup. He is a member of the National Soccer Hall of Fame.

Simpkins-Ford
Annis was a member of the St. Louis Simpkins-Ford club from at least 1948 to 1950. During that time, Simpkins was a dominant team, winning both the 1948 and 1950 National Challenge Cup championships.

National and Olympic Teams
Annis was selected for the American squad at the 1948 Summer Olympics. However, he did not play in the only U.S. game of the tournament, a 9–0 loss to Italy.

Later that summer, he earned his only caps with the national team, a 3–1 win over Israel on September 26, 1948. In 1950, Annis was part of the U.S. team at the 1950 FIFA World Cup, but never entered a game as the U.S. went 1–2 in the first round. Annis was inducted into the National Soccer Hall of Fame in 1995, along with the rest of the 1950 U.S. World Cup squad.

Personal Information
Born in Saint Louis, Annis was the son of Frank and Katherine Annis. He was married to Lena M. Annis (née Montani). He died on March 31, 1995, in Saint Louis, and is buried in Resurrection Cemetery in Affton, Missouri.

References

1928 births
1995 deaths
American soccer players
St. Louis Simpkins-Ford players
National Soccer Hall of Fame members
Olympic soccer players of the United States
Footballers at the 1948 Summer Olympics
1950 FIFA World Cup players
Soccer players from St. Louis
United States men's international soccer players
Association football defenders